Havelange is a municipality of Wallonia located in the province of Namur, Belgium.

On 1 January 2006 the municipality had 4,844 inhabitants. The total area is 104.73 km², giving a population density of 45 inhabitants per km².

Other centres 
Apart from Havelange itself, the municipality also comprises the following districts :
 Barvaux-Condroz, including the eponymous castle, still owned by the noble Aspremont-Lynden family
 Flostoy, including the hamlet of Bormenville and its castle
 Jeneffe
 Maffe
 Méan
 Miécret
 Porcheresse
 Verlée

See also
 List of protected heritage sites in Havelange

References

External links 
 
 Official website (in French)

Municipalities of Namur (province)